Caloptilia celtina is a moth of the family Gracillariidae. It is known from South Africa.

The larvae feed on Celtis africana. They mine the leaves of their host plant. The mine has the form of a small, irregular, very transparent blotch-mine in fork of two strong veins, usually near base of leaf or near midrib.

References

Endemic moths of South Africa
celtina
Moths of Africa
Moths described in 1961